Desognanops is a genus of spiders in the family Trachycosmidae. It was first described in 2008 by Platnick. , it contains only one species, Desognanops humphreysi, found in Western Australia.

References

Trochanteriidae
Monotypic Araneomorphae genera
Spiders of Australia